Lord John Pakenham Joicey-Cecil (3 March 1867 – 25 June 1942) was a British Conservative politician.

Joicey-Cecil was the fourth son of William Cecil, 3rd Marquess of Exeter, and his wife Lady Georgina Sophia, daughter of Thomas Pakenham, 2nd Earl of Longford. Brownlow Cecil, 4th Marquess of Exeter and  Lord William Cecil  were his elder brothers.

He was commissioned an officer in the Grenadier Guards. After resigning from the regular army, he was appointed major in the 4th (Militia) Battalion, the Lincolnshire Regiment on 17 November 1897. After his elder brother Lord William resigned from his command of the battalion, Lord John was on 25 October 1902 appointed in command and promoted lieutenant-colonel.

Joicey-Cecil was elected to the House of Commons for Stamford in 1906, a seat he held until January 1910 general election. In April 1910, he was appointed a deputy lieutenant of Lincolnshire.

Joicey-Cecil married Isabella Maud Joicey in 1896 and assumed the additional surname of Joicey. He died in June 1942, aged 75.

See also
Marquess of Exeter

References

www.thepeerage.com

External links 
 

1867 births
1942 deaths
Younger sons of marquesses
John
Conservative Party (UK) MPs for English constituencies
Deputy Lieutenants of Lincolnshire
UK MPs 1906–1910